La volonté de paix  was a French magazine, which was the organ of the International Committee of Action and Propaganda for Peace and Disarmament. It was established in June 1927 by Madeleine Vernet. It ceased publication in January 1936, after being banned when Vernet's husband Louis Tribier was tried for provoking military disobedience.

References

1927 establishments in France
1936 disestablishments in France
Defunct political magazines published in France
French-language magazines
Magazines established in 1927
Magazines disestablished in 1936